Antonín Theodor von Colloredo-Waldsee (also: Colloredo-Waldsee-Melz or Colloredo-Melz und Waldsee) (17 July 1729 – 12 November 1811) was a cardinal of the Roman Catholic Church.

Biography
Antonín was born on 29 June 1729 in Vienna as the son of Count Lodovico Colloredo-Waldesee Mels (1698–1767) and Princess Eleonore Gonzaga di Vescovato (1699–1779). He obtained his utroque iure at the University of Padua on 3 March 1752.

He was ordained as a priest on 20 August 1758 in Olomouc and was elected its bishop on 6 October 1777. On 5 December 1777 he was promoted Archbishop of Olomouc. He was consecrated at the Salzburg Cathedral on 17 May 1778 by Hieronymus Joseph Franziskus von Colloredo. In 1790, he participated in the Diet of Frankfurt. He was recommended to the cardinalate at the behest of Emperor Francis I, and was created cardinal on 17 January 1803 by Pope Pius VII. He died on 12 September 1811 in Kroměříž, where he is buried at the cathedral of Saint Moritz.

References 

1729 births
1811 deaths
Bishops of Olomouc
Clergy from Vienna
Nobility from Vienna
University of Padua alumni
19th-century Austrian cardinals
18th-century Roman Catholic bishops in the Holy Roman Empire